Photeros is a genus in the Cypridinidae. The genus contains bioluminescent species, and is one of the genera of bioluminescent ostracods which show stereotyped bioluminescent mating signals.

References

Bioluminescent ostracods
Ostracod genera